Malikism may refer to:

 Malikism is a school of Islamic law.
 Malikism in Algeria is the practice of fiqh jurisprudence in Algeria.

See also
Maleki (disambiguation)
Maliki (disambiguation)